The family Oplophoridae is a taxon of pelagic shrimp and the only subtaxon of the superfamily Oplophoroidea. It contains the following genera:
Acanthephyra A. Milne-Edwards, 1881
Ephyrina Smith, 1885
Heterogenys Chace, 1986
Hymenodora Sars, 1877
Janicella Chace, 1986
Kemphyra Chace, 1986
Meningodora Smith, 1882
Notostomus A. Milne-Edwards, 1881
† Odontochelion Garassino, 1994
Oplophorus H. Milne-Edwards, 1837
Systellaspis Bate, 1888
† Tonellocaris Garassino, 1998

Molecular phylogenetics suggests that the family as currently circumscribed is polyphyletic, and may lead to the resurrection of a family Acanthephyridae for all genera except Oplophorus, Systellaspis and Janicella.

References

External links

Caridea
Decapod families